"End of Me" is the second single from A Day to Remember's fifth album, Common Courtesy, released in 2013. It was released to radio on March 25, 2014.

Music and lyrics
The song came about from singer Jeremy McKinnon and producer Andrew Wade messing around in the studio with an acoustic guitar: "the song just came from something that he [Wade] played on that I thought was so awesome that the vocal line came more or less immediately came to me."

Music video 
A music video for the song, directed by Shane Drake, was released on 23 June 2014.

Track listing
"End of Me" – 3:58

Personnel
Personnel per digital booklet.

A Day to Remember
Jeremy McKinnon — lead vocals
Josh Woodard — bass guitar
Neil Westfall — rhythm guitar
Alex Shelnutt — drums 
Kevin Skaff — lead guitar and vocals

Production
Jeremy McKinnon, Andrew Wade, Chad Gilbert — producers
Andrew Wade – engineer
Ken Andrews – mixing
Ted Jensen – mastering

Chart positions

References

A Day to Remember songs
Song recordings produced by Chad Gilbert
Song recordings produced by Andrew Wade
Song recordings produced by Jeremy McKinnon
Songs written by Jeremy McKinnon
2014 singles
2013 songs
Music videos directed by Shane Drake
Songs written by Chad Gilbert